Alexander Lang (born 24 September 1941) is a German actor and stage director.

Life

Early years
Lang was born in Erfurt a couple of years after the outbreak of the Second World War.   His father was an architect.   He attended the Humboldt ("Grammar") School in the city before embarking, in 1961/62 on an apprenticeship as a sign and poster designer.   Erfurt was by now part of the German Democratic Republic, a stand-alone Soviet sponsored state covering the eastern portion of what had remained of Germany following frontier changes mandated in May 1945 when the war had ended.   By the end of 1962 Lang was working as a stage technician at the Erfurt city theatre, work with which he continued till 1964.  He then, till 1966, undertook a study period at the National Theatre School in the Niederschöneweide quarter on the south side of Berlin.

The actor
During his final year of study Alexander Lang also worked on Peter Hacks' production of Der Schuhu und die fliegende Prinzessin. In 1967 Lang switched to the Berliner Ensemble and then, in 1969, to the Deutsches Theater which is where he would build his reputation and his career as, in the first instance, an actor. He began, in addition, to direct plays at the Deutsches Theater in 1978. His first major role at the Deutsches Theater was as Ferdinand in Schiller's Intrigue and Love (1972). That was followed with the part of Paul Bauch in Volker Braun's Die Kipper (1973), Caliban in The Tempest (1974), the title role in von Kleist's The Prince of Homburg (1975) and another title role  in Heiner Müller's Philoktet (1977).

Lang's film and television appearances were relatively infrequent.   Nevertheless, there was a prominent part in Konrad Wolf's Solo Sunny, and he took the title role in  television adaptation of Stephan Hermlin's short story, Der Leutnant Yorck von Wartenburg (1981).

The stage director
Alexander Lang began directing productions at the end of the 1970s, starting with his own, Das Biest des Monsieur Racine oder Das Wunder der Phantasie (1977 - based on a "Bande dessinée" comic-strip story by Tomi Ungerer).   His productions of  Horribilicribrifax by Andreas Gryphius followed in 1978 and of Ernst Toller's Der entfesselte Wotan in 1979.

In 1981 the city of Berlin awarded its Goethe Prize to Lang.   In 1985 he was a winner of the National Prize of East Germany and in 1986 he became a member of the National Arts Academy.   In May 1986 he announced he was taking a three-year break from the Deutsches Theater and started a stint as a guest director at the Munich Kammerspiele Theatre.   Here, in 1987, he staged a double programme of Racine's Phèdre and Kleist's Penthesilea.   His next planned production was a presentation of Der Ring des Nibelungen at the Berlin State Opera, but this production was indefinitely postponed, and in 1987 Lang returned to Munich and was directed by Bernard-Marie Koltès in Koltès' In der Einsamkeit der Baumwollfelder.

His first production at Hamburg was of Goethe's Clavigo (1988). His next Hamburg productions were of Rückkehr in die Wüste by Bernard-Marie Koltès and Der Hofmeister by Jakob Michael Reinhold Lenz. In addition, in 1989 he worked at the Nederlands Toneel as a guest producer of Chekhov's Three Sisters

Eight months before protesters breached the Berlin Wall in November 1989, Lang had been able to cross to West Berlin where he took a job as senior director at the Schiller Theater.   At the same time, together with Alfred Kirchner, Volkmar Clauß und Vera Sturm, he was a co-director of the National Drama Theatre in the eastern half of the still divided city.  In 1990 at the Schiller Theatre he staged (with Bernhard Minetti) Themes from the Grimm Brothers, as well as Schiller's The Robbers.   The next year, with the city now reunified, he presented a new production of Goethe's Iphigenie auf Tauris and another of Molière's The Imaginary Invalid.

In 1993 the Schiiler Theatre company was closed down for financial reasons:  shortly before this happened, in April, Alexander Lang returned to the Deutsches Theater.

Subsequently Alexander Lang worked as a guest director with the Comédie-Française in Paris (Kleist's  Prinz Friedrich von Homburg, 1994, Lessing's Nathan the Wise, 1999, Goethe's Faust I, 1999).   He also did work with the Munich Kammerspiele Theatre where in 1996 he directed Herbert Achternbusch's Der letzte Gast, and at the Bregenzer Festspiele.   At the Munich Residenz Theatre he directed Tankred Dorst's comedy, Wegen Reichtum geschlossen (1998), at the Leipzig Playhouse Hebbel's Die Nibelungen (2000), and at the National Theatre in Weimar, Hamlet (2001).   Under Volker Hesse at Berlin's Maxim Gorki Theater Lang staged several more productions: Gorki's The Lower Depths (2003), Ewers' Das Wundermärchen von Berlin (2005) and Kleist's The Broken Jug (2006).

Lang also appeared again as an actor at the Maxim Gorki Theater, in 2005, in  production of Vor Sonnenuntergang ("Before the sun goes down").

References

German theatre directors
20th-century German male actors
Actors from Erfurt
Recipients of the National Prize of East Germany
Members of the Academy of Arts, Berlin
1941 births
Living people